, also known as , is an exhibition center in the city of Nagoya, Aichi, Japan.

Concerts 
Queen

BABYMETAL - ARISES - BEYOND THE MOON - LEGEND - M - 6 and 7 June 2019

Twice - Twice World Tour 2019 "Twicelights" - 29, 30 November and 1 December 2019

Coldrain - Live & Backstage at Blare Fest. 2020 - 1 and 2 February 2020

External links

Tourist attractions in Nagoya
Buildings and structures in Nagoya
Convention centers in Japan
Cultural infrastructure completed in 1973
Event venues established in 1973
Music venues in Japan
1973 establishments in Japan